Stairway to Heaven is the title of an R&B single by Pure Soul. It was the final single from their debut album. A radio-remix of the single was serviced to radio featuring The O'Jays, who originally recorded the song on their Family Reunion album in 1975.

Chart positions

References

1996 singles
1975 songs
Songs written by Kenny Gamble
Interscope Records singles
Songs written by Leon Huff
Songs with lyrics by Cary Gilbert